Angraecum pectinatum is a species of orchid native to Madagascar, Mauritius, Réunion, and Comoros.

References

pectinatum
Orchids of Réunion
Orchids of Madagascar
Orchids of Africa
Plants described in 1822
Orchids of Mauritius